Sven Haraldsson (born 22 March 1977 in Jönköping, Sweden), is a Swedish production designer and costume designer. He was educated at the Dramatiska Institutet between 2003 and 2006.

Selected theatre works

2006 - Hamlet, regi Catharina Larsson, Borås Stadsteater
2007 - Det sista ni hör från mig, regi Paula Stenström, Lumor/Riksteatern
2007 - Figaros Bröllop (kostym), regi Philip Zandén, Stockholms Stadsteater
2008 - Folkeutrydning, regi Kjersti Horn, Den Nationale Scene Bergen
2008 - Fem gånger Gud, regi Hugo Hansén, Stockholms Stadsteater
2008 - Dumb Show (kostym), regi Kjersti Horn, Dramaten
2009 - Skimmer, regi Hugo Hansén, Malmö Stadsteater
2009 - I väntan på Godot, regi Thommy Berggren, Stockholms Stadsteater
2009 - Solen Gustav, regi Anette Norberg, Dramaten
2009 - Lärare för livet, regi Måns Lagerlöf, Stockholms Stadsteater
2010 - Spring Awakening, regi Kjersti Horn, Oslo Nye Teater
2010 - Dödsdansen, regi Mia Winge, Strindsbergs Intima Teater/Stockholms Stadsteater
2011 - Utrensning, regi Åsa Melldahl, Stockholms Stadsteater
2011 - Anna Karenina, regi Kjersti Horn, Stockholms Stadsteater
2011 - Gerdan Roth, regi Monica Almqvist Lovén, Riksteatern
2011 - Den Halvfärdiga Himlen, regi Mia Winge, Strindsbergs Intima Teater/Stockholms Stadsteater
2011 - Gregorius, regi Emma Bucht, Stockholms Stadsteater
2011 - Blev det inte mer än såhär?, Stockholms Stadsteater
2011 - En julsaga, Smålands Musik och Teater
2012 - Grabben i graven bredvid, regi Åsa Melldahl, Norrbottensteatern
2012 - Onkel Vanja, regi Eirik Stubbø, Stockholms Stadsteater
2012 - Arkivet för orealiserbara drömmar och visioner, regi Marcus Lindeen, Stockholms Stadsteater
2012 - Ett Drömspel, regi Jakob Höglund, Teater Viirus, Helsingfors
2012 - From Sammy with love, regi Jonna Nordenskiöld, Stockholms Stadsteater
2012 - Flickor och pojkar, regi Jakob Höglund, Scenekonst Sörmland
2012 - Krig, regi Camilla Wargo Brekling, Stockholms Stadsteater
2012 - Schulz goes Kafka, regi Marika Lagerckrantz, Stockholms Stadsteater
2013 - Martyrer, regi Dritëro Kasapi, Stockholms Stadsteater
2013 - Søstra mi, regi Kersti Horn, Riksteatret
2013 - Apatiska för nyborgare, regi Sara Giese, Stockholms Stadsteater
2013 - Vem är publiken, regi Tatu Hämäläinen, Stockholms Stadsteater
2013 - Blodsbröder, regi Alexander Öberg, Stockholms Stadsteater
2013 - Grodregn över Fruängen, regi Sara Giese, Stockholms Stadsteater
2013 - Arnold, regi Olof Hanson, Stockholms Stadsteater
2014 - Skaka galler, regi och koreografi Anna Vnuk, Kulturhuset Stadsteatern
2014 - Älskaren, regi Mårten Andersson, Riksteatern

References

Källor 
Kulturhuset Stadsteatern
Malmö Stadsteater
Radio Min Passion

Living people
1977 births
People from Jönköping
Swedish costume designers
Swedish production designers
Dramatiska Institutet alumni